Okroglo is a settlement in the Municipality of Naklo in the Upper Carniola region of Slovenia.

Church

The local church is dedicated to Mary Magdalene.

References

External links

Okroglo on Geopedia

Populated places in the Municipality of Naklo